Ladwig is a surname. Notable people with the surname include:

A. J. Ladwig (born 1992), American baseball player
Bernd Ladwig (born 1966), German political philosopher
Bonnie Ladwig (born 1939), American politician
Désirée H. Ladwig (born 1964), German economist
E. James Ladwig (born 1938), American politician
Mark Ladwig (born 1980), American pair skater

Surnames from given names